Space imaging may refer to:

 Astronomical image processing of objects usually beyond the Solar System
 Earth imaging satellites
 Images processed that are produced from the exploration of Mars
 Images produced by any uncrewed space mission
 Images taken by any crewed space mission
 Other images from the history of space exploration. See the timeline of planetary exploration

Companies
 Space Imaging Corporation
 other remote sensing companies